Masonic Hall in New York City is the headquarters of the Grand Lodge of Free and Accepted Masons of the State of New York. The building was constructed to replace a previous Masonic Hall (built in 1875 and designed by Napoleon LeBrun), that stood on the same site.

The current building was designed by Harry P. Knowles, one of the architects of the New York City Center.  It actually consists of two interconnected buildings, one (constructed in 1913) on the corner of 23rd St and 6th Avenue, and the other (constructed in 1907) facing 24th St. The 23rd St. building is primarily a commercial office building, with rents generating funds for the Grand Lodge's charitable activities and the upkeep of the 24th Street building.  The 24th St. building consists primarily of lodge meeting rooms, including the 1200-seat Grand Lodge Room, all elaborately ornamented.  The Hall's interior was restored in 1986-96 by Felix Chavez, Fine Art Decorating.

References

External links

Masonic Hall photo gallery hosted on the Grand Lodge of New York website.

1907 establishments in New York City
Buildings and structures completed in 1907
Clubhouses in Manhattan
Flatiron District
Masonic buildings completed in 1913
Masonic buildings in New York (state)
Masonic buildings